Niphothixa is a genus of moths belonging to the subfamily Tortricinae of the family Tortricidae.

Species
Niphothixa amphibola Diakonoff, 1960
Niphothixa atava Diakonoff, 1970
Niphothixa niphadacra Diakonoff, 1960
Niphothixa ophina Bradley, 1965

Former species
Niphothixa dryocausta (Meyrick, 1938)

See also
List of Tortricidae genera

References

External links
tortricidae.com

Archipini
Tortricidae genera